Szabolcs Bátori (born 7 May 2002 in Miskolc) is a Hungarian artistic gymnast.

Career 
Szabolcs Bátori won a bronze in senior team at the 2020 European Men's Artistic Gymnastics Championships.

References

Living people
2002 births
Hungarian male artistic gymnasts
Sportspeople from Miskolc
21st-century Hungarian people